Marco Antonio Plaza Berríos (born 24 February 1982) is a Chilean former professional footballer who played as a midfielder.

Club career
On 12 December 2009, La Estrella de Arica reported Plaza was hired by Coquimbo Unido to face the 2010 Primera B de Chile championship.

In 2015, he joined Deportes Ovalle.

Personal life

Honours
Ñublense
 Tercera División (1): 2004

Iberia
 Segunda División (1): 2012

References

External links
 
 

1982 births
Living people
People from Casablanca, Chile
Chilean footballers
Everton de Viña del Mar footballers
Ñublense footballers
Deportes Iberia footballers
Lota Schwager footballers
Rangers de Talca footballers
Unión La Calera footballers
Deportes Melipilla footballers
Coquimbo Unido footballers
Deportes Ovalle footballers
Malleco Unido footballers
Primera B de Chile players
Segunda División Profesional de Chile players
Association football midfielders